The Palm Canyon Times was a bi-weekly newspaper and magazine primarily for Palm Springs, California and the adjoining cities in Palm Springs areas of the Coachella Valley. The newspaper was named after the main valley thoroughfare called "Palm Canyon Drive" within Palm Springs. As a community newspaper it focused on local personalities, community leaders and businesses, charitable organizations and upcoming events in the community. The newspaper was an early supporter of the Palm Springs International Film Festival working with founder Mayor Sonny Bono and Festival Chairman, Craig Prater. The newspaper was also a supporter of many local entertainment venues in the city promoting upcoming events and shows with pre-reviews and editorials, to maximize local support. A free publication, the newspaper was supported by print advertising and subscriptions, with circulation in excess of 22,000 per edition, a staff of 18 part-time writers, and full-time production, circulation and graphics personnel.

The editor and publisher of The Palm Canyon Times from its inception in September 1993 until it ceased publication in December 1996 was Neal Simmons, who at that time was also the on-line host for a locally produced 1-hour daily radio program called “Talk of the Town” on 1010 AM radio station, a 1-hour nightly radio program “That's Life” on 1450 AM radio, and later a locally produced weekly 1-hour television talk show called “The Corner Table”. Many guests of the radio and TV shows were also invited to write articles of general interest about their careers, business or social activities.

References

Palm Springs, California